Clinton Historic District may refer to:

Old Clinton Historic District, Clinton, Georgia
Clinton Downtown Historic District (Clinton, Indiana)
Downtown Clinton Historic District, Clinton, Massachusetts
Clinton Downtown Historic District (Clinton, Michigan)
Clinton Square Historic District, Clinton, Missouri
Clinton Historic District (Clinton, New Jersey)
Clinton Hill Historic District, New York, New York
Clinton Hill South Historic District, New York, New York
Clinton Street Historic District, Philadelphia

See also
Clinton Avenue Historic District (disambiguation)
Clinton Commercial Historic District (disambiguation)